Captain Neil Ritz Smuts (born 23 December 1898, date of death unknown) was a World War I flying ace credited with five aerial victories.

Smuts was credited with an Albatros D.V and four Fokker D.VIIs driven down out of control from 6 April 1918 until 4 October 1918.

References

1898 births
Afrikaner people
South African World War I flying aces
Year of death missing
People from Johannesburg
Recipients of the Distinguished Flying Cross (United Kingdom)